Scintimammography is a type of breast imaging test that is used to detect cancer cells in the breasts of some women who have had abnormal mammograms, or for those who have dense breast tissue, post-operative scar tissue or breast implants.

Scintimammography is not used for screening or in place of a mammogram. Rather, it is used when the detection of breast abnormalities is not possible or not reliable on the basis of mammography and ultrasound.

Procedure

In the scintimammography procedure, a woman receives an injection of a small amount of a radioactive substance which is taken up by cancer cells, and a gamma camera is used to take pictures of the breasts.

Technetium-99m sestamibi (99mTc-MIBI) is the most commonly used radiopharmaceutical. When performed with MIBI the procedure may also be known as a Miraluma test. The typical dose is 740–1,110 megabecquerels (MBq) with the patient lying prone on the bed for imaging approximately 10 minutes after injection.

99mTc-DMSA and 99mTc-MDP may also been used, but provide less sensitive results.

Equipment
Breast-specific gamma cameras have been developed with a smaller field of view than conventional cameras, allowing higher resolution imagery and compression of the breast as in x-ray mammography (which improves detection of smaller lesions).

See also
 Technetium (99mTc) sestamibi
 Nuclear medicine
 Positron emission mammography

References

External links
 Scintimammography entry in the public domain NCI Dictionary of Cancer Terms

2d nuclear medical imaging
Breast imaging
Cancer screening